National Aquatic Centre or National Aquatics Centre may refer to:

National Aquatic Centre, Blanchardstown, Dublin, Ireland
Beijing National Aquatics Center, also known as the Water Cube, the site of the 2008 Summer Olympics
National Aquatic Centre, National Sports Complex, Malaysia
National Aquatic Centre, Couva, Trinidad and Tobago